Donald John DeMola (born July 5, 1952) is former Major League Baseball pitcher. After that, he suffered an injury that required arm surgery, and he appeared in just one game for the Denver Bears of the American Association (AAA) in 1976. He continued to pitch in the Expos minor league system through 1978, but was never able to return to the Major League level.

External links

1952 births
Living people
American expatriate baseball players in Canada
Baseball players from New York (state)
Denver Bears players
Fort Lauderdale Yankees players
Johnson City Yankees players
Memphis Blues players
Memphis Chicks players
Montreal Expos players
Oneonta Yankees players
Québec Carnavals players
West Palm Beach Expos players